Paludinella conica is a species of minute salt marsh snail with an operculum, an aquatic gastropod mollusk or micromollusk in the family Assimineidae. This species is found in Guam and the Northern Mariana Islands.

References

Paludinella
Gastropods described in 1894
Assimineidae
Taxonomy articles created by Polbot